Newtown Blues are a Gaelic Athletic Association club from Drogheda, County Louth, Ireland. The club fields Gaelic football teams in competitions organised by Louth GAA. They are the most successful club in Louth GAA and hold the record for the most Louth Senior Football Championships won in Gaelic football history. The club won their last such title in the 2019 Louth Senior Football Championship.

The club, which was founded on 12 July 1887, has its home ground on the Newfoundwell road, beside the local secondary school. The club's colours are sky blue and white.

Notable players
 Jamie Carr
 Colm Judge
 Colin Kelly
 Jimmy Mulroy
 Ged Nash

Honours
Louth Senior Football Championship (23): 1889, 1932, 1933, 1936, 1961, 1962, 1963, 1964, 1966, 1967, 1969, 1970, 1974, 1981, 1986, 1988, 2000, 2001, 2008, 2013, 2017, 2018, 2019
 Louth Junior Football Championship (1): 1958
 Louth Minor Football Championship (8): 1956, 1957, 1958, 1970, 1975, 2004, 2014, 2015
 Louth Under-21 Football Championship (8): 1978, 1979, 1996, 1999, 2004, 2005, 2017, 2018

References

External links
 Newtown Blues GAA Club website (archived 2017)
 "Louth Teams have Ground for Optimism" (2 November 2013) Dundalk Democrat. Retrieved 2 November 2013.

Gaelic games clubs in County Louth
Gaelic football clubs in County Louth